The Somaliland Journalists Association (('SOLJA) is a media association for journalists in Somaliland, based in Hargeisa.
SOLJA is a nonprofit organization made by journalists working in the media industry of Somaliland. The association promotes the role of a free media in Somaliland society, and protects the rights of journalists in Somaliland. It was founded on June 2003.

See also

 Media of Somaliland
 Ministry of Information (Somaliland)

References

External links
 Official website

Journalism organizations
Organisations based in Somaliland